Penicillium maximae is a species in the genus Penicillium which is named after Queen Máxima of the Netherlands.

References

Further reading 

 

maximae
Fungi described in 2013